Communauté de communes des Deux Sources (fr: the community of communes of the Two Sources) is a French former inter-commune structure, located in the department of the Pas-de-Calais and the Hauts-de-France region. It was established in 2008 from the merger of 2 Communauté de communes: the communauté de communes du Canton de Pas-en-Artois (the community of communes in Pas-en-Artois) and the communauté de communes des Villages solidaires (community of communes of independent villages). It was dissolved in January 2017, when most of its communes joined the Communauté de communes des Campagnes de l'Artois.

Composition
The Communauté de communes comprised the following communes:

Amplier 
Barly  
Bavincourt  
Beaudricourt 
Beaufort-Blavincourt  
Berlencourt-le-Cauroy  
Bienvillers-au-Bois  
Canettemont  
Couin 
Coullemont 
Couturelle  
Denier 
Estrée-Wamin  
Famechon  
Foncquevillers 
Gaudiempré
Givenchy-le-Noble  
Gommecourt 
Grand-Rullecourt  
Grincourt-lès-Pas 
Halloy  
Hannescamps 
Hébuterne  
Hénu 
Houvin-Houvigneul  
Humbercamps  
Ivergny  
Le Souich  
Liencourt  
Lignereuil
Magnicourt-sur-Canche 
Mondicourt 
Orville
Pas-en-Artois 
Pommera  
Pommier 
Puisieux  
Rebreuve-sur-Canche  
Rebreuviette  
Sailly-au-Bois  
Saint-Amand 
Sars-le-Bois  
Sarton, Pas-de-Calais  
Saulty  
Sombrin  
Souastre  
Sus-Saint-Léger  
Thièvres 
Warlincourt-lès-Pas
Warluzel

References

External links
Community of communes des Deux Sources 

Deux Sources